Arthur Boice "Andy" VanGundy Jr. (May 24, 1946 – May 5, 2009) was a US communication professor, conference speaker, author and internationally noted expert on idea-generation techniques.

Biography
Arthur B. VanGundy Jr. was born May 24, 1946, in Lancaster, Ohio, to Dr. Arthur Boice and Sarajane ("Sally") Miesse VanGundy as the eldest of four boys. He graduated from high school in Lancaster in 1964 and earned a B.A. in Psychology from Ohio Wesleyan University in 1968, a M.S. in Personnel Counseling from Miami University (Ohio) in 1970, and a Ph.D. in Higher Education Administration from Ohio State University in 1975; during this time he worked as an Organizational development consultant for the US Air Force. In 1976, he moved to Norman, Oklahoma, as Assistant Professor of Human relationships at the University of Oklahoma. He became an Associate Professor in 1982 and Full Professor in 1987, after moving to the Department of Communication, where he worked until his retirement in May 2008.

While at the Ohio State University, he married Denilyn Wilson, who moved with him to Norman. The couple had two daughters, Sarah and Laura. The marriage was later divorced in 1988.

Work
VanGundy contributed more than 16 books and numerous book chapters and magazine articles in magazines like Business Week, U.S. News & World Report, and The New York Times. His book "Techniques of structured problem solving" is considered by many as "the bible of problem solving techniques". He wrote the creativity training program for the American Management Association (AMA) and the creativity chapter for the American Marketing Association’s (AMA) Marketing Encyclopedia. He performed research specifically in the area of the creative person and the creative climate.

His tools and techniques expertise span from performing research on ideation performance  to the design of numerous new creative problem solving formats and strategies, such as the PICL-list, Word Diamond, Fresh Eye, Object Stimulation, Try to become the problem, and  Air Cliché/Haikugami, including both purely intuitive techniques and highly structured formats.

He served on the board of directors for the annual North American creativity conference CPSI and the Creative Education Foundation (CEF). Also he was the editor of CPSI/CEF’s Creativity in Action newsletter and a member of the Academy of Management.

Books 
 Arthur B. VanGundy: 101 Activities for teaching creativity and problem solving. San Francisco 2005  
 Arthur B. VanGundy: 101 More Great Games and Activities. New York 2005. 
 Arthur B. VanGundy: 108 Ways to get a bright idea. New Jersey 1983. 
 Arthur B. VanGundy: Brain Boosters for Business Advantage. New York 1994. 
 Arthur B. VanGundy: Creative Problem Solving: A guide for trainers and management. Westport 1987.  According to WorldCat, the book is held in 1192 libraries  
 Arthur B. VanGundy: Getting to Innovation: How Asking the Right Questions Generates the Great Ideas Your Company Needs. New York 2007.  According to WorldCat, the book is held in 1389 libraries
 Arthur B. VanGundy: Idea Power. New York: American Management Association  1992.  According to WorldCat, the book is held in 1986 libraries  
 Arthur B. VanGundy: Managing Group Creativity: A Modular Approach to Problem Solving. New York 1984. 
 Arthur B. VanGundy: Stalking the Wild Solution: A Problem Finding Approach to Creative Problem Solving. 1988 
 Arthur B. VanGundy: Techniques of structured problem solving. New York 1988. 
 Arthur B. VanGundy: Training your creative mind. Englewood Cliffs 1982. 
 Arthur B. VanGundy, Linda Naimann: Orchestrating Collaboration at work. 2003.

References

Further reading
 J. Michael Fox, Ronni L. Fox: Exploring the nature of creativity. Dubuque 2000. 
 James M. Higgins: 101 Creative problem solving techniques. Winter Park 2006. 
 Tudor Rickards: The Routledge companion to creativity. London 2008.

External links
 Obituary in the Creativity at work-Blog
 Obituary in the CreaJour-Hall of Fame of creativity (German)

Popular psychology
20th-century American psychologists
Creativity researchers
University of Oklahoma faculty
1946 births
2009 deaths